The St. Mary's Cathedral is a religious building that is affiliated with the Catholic Church and is located in the city of Port Moresby, capital of Papua New Guinea,].

The cathedral is the headquarters of the Metropolitan Archdiocese of Port Moresby (Archidioecesis Portus Moresbiensis) in the National Capital District. It follows the Roman or Latin rite and was visited by John Paul II in May 1984. It is dedicated as its name indicates to the Blessed Virgin Mary. The exterior is decorated with light blue and white tower stands on one side of the main entrance.

See also
Catholic Church in Papua New Guinea
St. Mary's Cathedral (disambiguation)
Roman Catholic Archdiocese of Port Moresby

References

Roman Catholic cathedrals in Papua New Guinea
Buildings and structures in Port Moresby